Elections to Hyndburn Borough Council were held on 1 May 2008. One third of the council was up for election and the Conservative party stayed in overall control of the council. Overall turnout was 37.9%.

The Conservative Party made the only gain of the election, taking Altham ward from the Labour Party to extend their majority to 6 following the defection of Malcolm Pritchard form Labour to Independent who also included David Mason who had left the Conservatives to go Independent..

After the election, the composition of the council was
Conservative 21
Labour 13
Independent 1

Election result

NB: Four (of the 16) Council ward seats that were NOT up for re-election in 2008 included the following wards - Clayton Le Moors, Huncoat, Immanuel in Oswaldtwistle and Milnshaw in Accrington.

Ward results

References

2008 Hyndburn election result
Ward results

2008 English local elections
2008
2000s in Lancashire